F. polyclada may refer to:

 Flourensia polyclada, an Argentinian tarwort
 Frullania polyclada, a liverwort with thin leaf-like flaps on either side of the stem